The Anchorage International Film Festival (AIFF) is the largest film festival in Alaska. It is held annually in Anchorage.

Founded in 2001, the festival takes place annually in December. Around 100 films are shown in several diverse categories. The festival is co-directed by Ida Theresa Myklebost and John Gamache 

The main venue for AIFF is the Bear Tooth Theatrepub which hosts the opening night celebration as well as several other films and events throughout the festival. AIFF also screens films at several venues around Anchorage.

History
The Anchorage International Film Festival was founded in 2001 by Tony Sheppard.
Since its inception the festival has grown to become the largest and only multi-genre film festival in Alaska.

In November 30, 2018, Anchorage was hit with a 7.0 earthquake on Opening Night. The Bear Tooth was heavily damaged. AIFF quickly found a new venue and opened one day late.

Awards

The awards are in the following main categories:
Best Feature Fiction
Best Feature Documentary
Best Short Fiction
Best Short Documentary
Best Animation
Best Feature Made In Alaska
Best Short Made In Alaska
Best Screenplay

See also 

Film festival
List of film festivals in North and Central America

References

External links
 Official website
 

2001 establishments in Alaska
Annual events in Alaska
Culture of Anchorage, Alaska
December events
Festivals in Alaska
Film festivals established in 2001
Film festivals in the United States

Special Note: The Anchorage International Film Festival (AIFF) is not associated with the Alaska International Film Awards (AIFA)